Winter wheat Russian mosaic virus (WWRMV) is a plant pathogenic virus of the family Rhabdoviridae.

External links
ICTVdB - The Universal Virus Database: Winter wheat Russian mosaic virus
Family Groups - The Baltimore Method

Nucleorhabdoviruses
Viral plant pathogens and diseases